Car games are games played to pass the time on long car journeys, often started by parents to amuse restless children. They generally require little or no equipment or playing space. Some such games are designed specifically to be played while traveling (e.g. the license plate game, the Alphabet Game, or "car tag" games like Punch Buggy), while others are games that can be played in a variety of settings including car journeys (e.g. twenty questions).

Alphabet Game

In the alphabet game, each player has to find the letters of the alphabet among signs and other pieces of text in the environment around them, working through the alphabet in order from A to Z. Players take turns, each turn lasting five miles of driving distance, and whoever gets further through the alphabet wins the game.

Car tag

A common car game is car tag. Car tag is when people look out for particular models of car on the road. The game ends when the travellers reach their destination, and the person who spotted the most wins. Cars in a dealership lot are usually not counted.

House rules may make certain car models trigger other effects beyond or instead of awarding points, most famously in the game variant known as "Punch Buggy" where spotting a Volkswagen Beetle allows the spotter to punch another passenger.

I Spy

I Spy is a common car game, one person calling out "I spy with my little eye something beginning with..." then naming a letter, and others attempting to guess the object that was spied.

Players may agree that any chosen object should remain visible during the journey, rather than something that will be passed and not seen again during the journey. Players may also agree to decide if the objects will be all outside or all inside the vehicle.

Sign cricket

Sign cricket is a British game where players earn points according to the numbers of legs  belonging to the people or animals in the pub's name. For example, a "Horse and Groom" pub would score 6 points: 4 for the four-legged horse, plus 2 for the two-legged groom.

See also

 I packed my bag
 Twenty Questions

References